Vegby is a locality situated in Ulricehamn Municipality, Västra Götaland County, Sweden with 549 inhabitants in 2010.

References 

Populated places in Västra Götaland County
Populated places in Ulricehamn Municipality